Olsen Crags is a rugged crags surmounting a small but conspicuous mountain block that projects into the east side of Amundsen Glacier just north of Epler Glacier, in the Queen Maud Mountains. Mapped by United States Geological Survey (USGS) from surveys and U.S. Navy air photos, 1960–64. Named by Advisory Committee on Antarctic Names (US-ACAN) for Karinius Olsen, cook on the Fram, the ship of Amundsen's Norwegian expedition of 1910–12. This naming preserves the spirit of Amundsen's 1911 commemoration of "Mount K. Olsen," a name applied for an unidentifiable mountain in the general area.

Cliffs of the Ross Dependency
Amundsen Coast